The 2011 South American Rhythmic Gymnastics Championships were held in Maracaibo, Venezuela, September 6–12, 2011.

Participating nations

Medalists

References 

2011 in gymnastics
Rhythmic Gymnastics,2011
International gymnastics competitions hosted by Venezuela
2011 in Venezuelan sport